Brooke Hayward (born July 5, 1937) is an American actress and model. Her memoir, Haywire was a best-seller.

Early life and education
Born in Los Angeles, Hayward is the eldest of three children born to agent turned film, television, and stage producer Leland Hayward and actress Margaret Sullavan. Brooke Hayward is a great-granddaughter of Monroe Hayward, former U.S. Senator-elect from Nebraska, and the granddaughter of Colonel William Hayward, who led the United States' 369th Infantry Regiment, aka the "Harlem Hellfighters", the first regiment composed entirely of African-American soldiers during the First World War. She is also a descendant of Mayflower passenger William White, and pilgrim Robert Coe. Hayward had a younger sister, Bridget, who died of a drug overdose, and a brother, producer William Hayward III, known as "Bill Hayward", who committed suicide.

When Hayward was seven years old, the family moved to a farm in Brookfield, Connecticut. Hayward's parents divorced in April 1948. The following year, Hayward's father married Nancy "Slim" Hawks (later known as Slim Keith). After his divorce from Slim Hawks, Leland Hayward married Pamela Harriman. Her mother married importer and producer Kenneth Wagg in 1950. Margaret Sullavan died of an accidental drug overdose on January 1, 1960. Nine months later, on October 17, 1960, Hayward's younger sister Bridget was found dead of a drug overdose in her apartment in New York City. Bridget left what was described as an "incoherent note", the contents of which never were made public. Her death was ruled a suicide. Hayward's brother Bill died of a self-inflicted gunshot wound on March 9, 2008.

Hayward attended Vassar College and studied acting with Lee Strasberg at the Actors Studio.

Career
As a model, Hayward appeared on the August 15, 1959, cover of Vogue, shot by Horst P. Horst.

In May 1961, Hayward made her Broadway debut in the stage production of Mandingo opposite her future husband Dennis Hopper. She made her film debut that same year in Burt Balaban's Mad Dog Coll. In one early episode of Bonanza ("The Storm", 1962), she played sea-ship captain's daughter Laura White. She delivered a memorable performance in the Twilight Zone episode "The Masks" in March 1964. Over the next 30 years, Hayward appeared in a handful of screen roles.

Throughout the 1960s, while married to actor, director, and photographer Dennis Hopper, Hayward took an active role in the contemporary art world, collecting works by such artists as Andy Warhol, Ed Ruscha, Frank Stella, and Roy Lichtenstein. She was also an avid collector of antiques from various periods and known for a highly idiosyncratic sense of design, as demonstrated by the house she shared with Hopper and their children, 1712 North Crescent Heights Boulevard in Los Angeles.

In 1977, Hayward wrote the best-seller Haywire, a childhood memoir that expounded on her family, the mental breakdowns of her mother and sister, and her own personal demons. Her last screen appearance was in a small role in John Guare's 1993 film adaptation of Six Degrees of Separation, with Stockard Channing, Donald Sutherland, and Will Smith.

Personal life
Hayward was married to Michael M. Thomas from July 1956 until their July 1960 divorce; they had two sons (William Thomas and Jeffrey Thomas).

Hayward met actor Dennis Hopper when they were both cast in Mandingo on Broadway in the spring of 1961. They were married in August 1961. They had a daughter, designer Marin Brooke Hopper, in June 1962 and together went on to be a force at the center of the creative scene in Los Angeles in the 1960s, collecting Pop art and enjoying a high degree of access to the worlds of contemporary art, rock music, and Hollywood. They separated in 1968 and divorced in 1969. The story of Hayward and Hopper's marriage, along with their childhoods and later lives, was told by Mark Rozzo in the best-selling 2022 cultural history/biography Everybody Thought We Were Crazy.

In 1981, Hayward began living with the pianist and bandleader Peter Duchin. They were married in 1985 and separated in 2008. They divorced in 2011. She divides her time between her loft in Manhattan and her country house in Litchfield County, Connecticut.

Filmography

Film

Television

Selected works

References

External links
 
 
 Brooke Hayward papers, 1911–1977, Billy Rose Theatre Division, New York Public Library for the Performing Arts
 Hayward Family Tree - Hayward Luxury

20th-century American actresses
Actors Studio alumni
Actresses from Connecticut
Actresses from Los Angeles
American film actresses
American memoirists
American stage actresses
American television actresses
Living people
People from Litchfield County, Connecticut
Vassar College alumni
American women memoirists
21st-century American women
1937 births